Coprobacillus cateniformis  is a bacterium from the genus of Coprobacillus which has been isolated from human feces in Japan.

References

External links
Type strain of Coprobacillus cateniformis at BacDive -  the Bacterial Diversity Metadatabase	

Erysipelotrichia
Bacteria described in 2000